War Zone is a now-defunct West coast rap supergroup consisting of Goldie Loc, MC Eiht, and Kam. They made their debut on Snoop Dogg's Tha Blue Carpet Treatment; after being unable to find them deals as separate artists, Snoop Dogg suggested they become a group, and started production on their album. According to Goldie Loc, the group has recorded about 13 tracks for a debut album. However, after time passed without finding a distribution deal, the group's various members parted to work on separate projects.

Features
 "Don't Stop" (from the Snoop Dogg album Tha Blue Carpet Treatment)
 "Shackled Up" (from the Snoop Dogg Presents The Big Squeeze)
 "Damn" (featuring Snoop Dogg)

American hip hop groups
Snoop Dogg
Hip hop supergroups
Musical groups established in 2006
Gangsta rap groups